Babeque Secundaria is a highschool in the Dominican Republic.

References

External links
 Babeque secundaria homepage (in Spanish)

Schools in the Dominican Republic